Əbdürrəhmanlı or Abdurakhmanly may refer to:
Aşağı Əbdürrəhmanlı, Azerbaijan
Yuxarı Əbdürrəhmanlı, Azerbaijan